Cartagena Club de Fútbol was a football club based in Cartagena, Region of Murcia. The club played 7 seasons in Segunda División. Cartagena CF disappeared at the end of the 1951–52 season for not paying its players.

Immediately after Cartagena CF's disappearance, the other club in Cartagena was founded, UD Cartagenera, that is playing currently in Tercera División.

Honours 

 Tercera División
 Winners 1929–30, 1932–33: 2
 Runners-Up 1931–32, 1947–48: 3
 Divisiones Regionales
 Winners 1934–35, 1935–36: 2

Season to season

6 seasons in Segunda División
12 seasons in Tercera División

Famous players
 Cabillo
 Diego Lucas

Sport in Cartagena, Spain
Defunct football clubs in the Region of Murcia
Association football clubs established in 1919
Association football clubs disestablished in 1952
1919 establishments in Spain
1952 disestablishments in Spain
Segunda División clubs